Middle Wyke is a hamlet in the Basingstoke and Deane district of Hampshire, England.  Its nearest town is Andover, which lies approximately 3.7 miles (6.1 km) south-west from the hamlet.

Governance
The hamlet is part of the civil parish of St Mary Bourne and is part of the Burghclere, Highclere and St Mary Bourne ward of Basingstoke and Deane borough council. The borough council is a Non-metropolitan district of Hampshire County Council.

References

Villages in Hampshire
Test Valley